The M91 is a short metropolitan route in Greater Johannesburg, South Africa. The entire route consists of one street (Monument Road) in the city of Kempton Park.

Route 
The M91 begins at a junction with the M96 Road (Amon Ngulele Road; Long Street) in the Kempton Park CBD. It goes northwards, meeting the eastern terminus of the M90 Road (CR Swart Drive), passing through Kempton Park Extension 2 and 4, to reach a junction with the M45 Road (Van Riebeeck Road) east of Allen Grove and west of Nimrod Park. It continues northwards, forming the western border of the Aston Manor suburb, to end at a junction with the M43 Road (Dann Road) in the Glen Marais suburb.

References 

Streets and roads of Johannesburg
Metropolitan routes in Johannesburg